The 2015 Jacksonville mayoral election took place on March 24, 2015, to elect the Mayor of Jacksonville, Florida.

The election is a blanket primary, with all candidates from all parties running together on the same ballot. As no candidate received a majority of the vote, a runoff was held between the top two vote-getters on May 19, 2015.

Incumbent Democratic Mayor Alvin Brown ran for re-election to a second term in office. He was narrowly defeated by Republican Lenny Curry by a margin of 5,285 votes.

Candidates

Democratic Party
Declared
 Alvin Brown, incumbent Mayor

Republican Party
Declared
 Bill Bishop, Jacksonville City Councilman
 Lenny Curry, former Chairman of the Republican Party of Florida

Withdrew
 Jim Overton, Duval County Property Appraiser and former Jacksonville City Councilman

Declined
 Bill Gulliford, President of the Jacksonville City Council and former Mayor of Atlantic Beach
 Mike Hogan, Chairman of the Florida Public Employee Relations Commission and candidate for Mayor in 2011

Independent Party of Florida
Did not qualify
 Tiffany Wingo, student

Independent
Declared
 Omega Allen, former member of the Northwest Jacksonville Trust Fund Advisory Committee

Withdrew
 Marvin Kramer, retired attorney and prosecutor

Primary election

Polling

Results

Runoff

Polling

Results

Endorsements

References

2015
Mayoral election, 2015
2015 Florida elections
Mayoral election, 2015
2015 United States mayoral elections